Baton Rouge General Medical Center – Bluebonnet Campus is a 201-bed, private hospital located at 8585 Picardy Avenue in Baton Rouge, Louisiana.  The hospital offers various medical services and surgical procedures in addition to an Emergency Department. The hospital is a subsidiary of General Health System (GHS), the corporate parent of Baton Rouge General that handles some administrative functions for the hospital. In addition to Baton Rouge General Medical Center, the GHS Organization includes Baton Rouge General Physicians, Mid City Redevelopment Alliance, Baton Rouge General Medical Center's Foundation and other programs spanning over the Capital city's nine-parish service area. Baton Rouge General Medical Center – Bluebonnet Campus and Baton Rouge General Medical Center - Mid-City Campus are considered one hospital with two locations.

Services
Emergency Department
OB/GYN
Neonatal Intensive Care Unit (NICU)
Intensive Care Unit (ICU)
Pennington Cancer Center
Medical/Surgical Care

External links
Official Site

Hospitals in Louisiana
Buildings and structures in Baton Rouge, Louisiana